Julia Lautowa (born 5 October 1981) is an Austrian former competitive figure skater in ladies' singles. She is the 1996 Cup of Russia silver medalist, a two-time Karl Schäfer Memorial champion, and a six-time Austrian national champion. She placed in the top ten at five ISU Championships.

Personal life 
Lautowa was born on 5 October 1981 in Moscow, Russian SFSR, Soviet Union, and moved to Vienna, Austria at the age of twelve. She became an Austrian citizen in 1996. She married Russian ice dancer Roman Kostomarov in June 2004 but the relationship has ended.

Career 
Lautowa began skating in 1985 in Moscow. Early in her career, she was coached by Marina Kudriavtseva, Elena Tchaikovskaia, and S. Gromov.

Competing for Austria, she made her first ISU Championship appearance at the 1994 Junior Worlds in Colorado Springs, Colorado; she qualified for the free skate and finished 15th overall.

In the 1994–95 season, Lautowa placed 24th at the 1995 World Junior Championships in Budapest and 21st at the 1995 European Championships in Dortmund. She missed the cut-off for the free skate at the 1995 World Championships in Birmingham.

In the 1996–97 season, Lautowa won her first senior international title at the Karl Schäfer Memorial. Appearing in the inaugural Champions Series (later known as the Grand Prix series), she placed fourth at the 1996 Skate America and was awarded the silver medal at the 1996 Cup of Russia. She also appeared twice on the junior level, placing sixth (12th in the short program, third in the free skate) at the 1997 Junior Worlds in Seoul, South Korea, and taking silver at the 1997 European Youth Olympic Festival in Sundsvall, Sweden. She finished 16th at the 1997 European Championships in Paris and 8th at the 1997 World Championships in Lausanne, having placed 5th in her qualifying group, 11th in the short, and 6th in the free.

In February 1998, Lautowa represented Austria at the Winter Olympics in Nagano, Japan. Ranked 21st in the short, she qualified for the free skate, where she placed 13th, lifting her to 14th overall.

Lautowa was off the ice for one year after sustaining a back injury in August 2000. She trained under Jana Hübler in Vienna during the 2001–02 season. She placed 12th at the 2002 Europeans and 22nd at the 2002 Worlds.

Hübler, Peter Jonas, and Marina Kudriavtseva coached Lautowa in the 2002–03 season. She ranked 26th at the 2003 Europeans in Malmö and 15th at the 2003 Worlds in Washington, D.C.

In her final competitive season, Lautowa trained under Kudriavtseva in Moscow. She finished eighth at the 2004 Europeans in Budapest and 25th at the 2004 Worlds in Dortmund.

Lautowa coaches figure skating at the Ice House of New Jersey.

Programs

Results 
GP: Champions Series / Grand Prix

References

External links

Navigation

1981 births
Austrian female single skaters
Olympic figure skaters of Austria
Figure skaters at the 1998 Winter Olympics
Living people
Naturalised citizens of Austria
Russian emigrants to Austria
Figure skaters from Moscow